George Lyttelton may be:

George Lyttelton (MP), Member of Parliament for Droitwich in 1586
George Lyttelton, 1st Baron Lyttelton (1709–1773), English politician
George Lyttelton, 2nd Baron Lyttelton (1763–1828), Anglo-Irish peer and politician
George Lyttelton, 4th Baron Lyttelton (1817–1876), founder of Canterbury, New Zealand
George William Lyttelton (1883–1962), English teacher and littérateur